The de Havilland Spectre is a rocket engine that was built by the de Havilland Engine Company in the 1950s. It was one element of the intended mixed power-plant for combination rocket-jet interceptor aircraft of the Royal Air Force, such as the Saunders-Roe SR.177.

Design and development
The Spectre was a bipropellant engine burning kerosene and hydrogen peroxide. The power could be controlled from 10–100% delivering 8,000 lbf (35.7 kN) of thrust at full power. In the SR.53 it used the same fuel tanks as the turbojet engine and if run at full power was expected to consume the full load in about seven minutes.

In 1952 static testing commenced with the Spectre DSpe.l. Design philosophy was matched to the mixed power concept of an aircraft having both a turbojet and rocket engine for maximum operational flexibility.

Primary innovation was as the first to incorporate its turbo pump turbine upstream of its combustion chamber. Described then as low loss.
Technological innovation embraced the Barske high-speed open-impeller centrifugal pumps, as formerly researched in the Walter organisation, regenerative cooling with pump stages both upstream and downstream, gauze catalyst packs, low-loss internal-flow turbine and the use of straight kerosene fuel. The aircraft tanks were to be pressurised to suppress pump cavitation problems.

It went through rig tests commencing in 1953, bench tests from mid-1954, and testing in two Canberras. From flight approval in Autumn 1956, flight experience again posed altitude starvation problems. Clearance was given for flight in the SR.53 prototype from May 1957.

In October 1957 a contract was announced for a more advanced version of the aircraft as the SR.177 to utilise a revised design Spectre DSpe.5 engine together with a reheated supersonic capability  thrust de Havilland Gyron Junior turbojet engine, thus meeting a full mixed-power aircraft concept. In conjunction with the new engine, development had been undertaken with two major ancillaries, a peroxide starter for the gas turbine and a peroxide auxiliary power unit. Virtually on the heels of the announcement of the contract came the notorious 1957 Defence White Paper declaring that all future combat would be undertaken by computer-controlled missiles, and that manned interceptors were now considered obsolete.

After merging of interests in 1959, it was manufactured by Bristol Siddeley.

The Spectre project was cancelled in October 1960, at a reported total cost of £5.75 million.

Variants

Variants included:
DSpe.1Initial version.
DSpe.2Constant thrust version, simpler design.
DSpe.3Development of Dspe.1 with variable thrust.
DSpe.4Development of Dspe.2, constant thrust RDS.15 ATO – "limited quantities".
DSpe.5Further development of Dspe.1, variable thrust.
DSpe.5A thrust version intended for the Saunders-Roe SR.177
DSpe.D.1 Double Spectre A doubled version of this engine, used for early flight-testing of Blue Steel nuclear stand off bomb, with two chambers arranged vertically; a fixed thrust D.Sp.4 above a variable thrust D.Sp.5.

The conventional Spectre DSpe.5 had been developed alongside a DSpe.4 RATO variant, the latter for the Avro Vulcan and Handley-Page Victor V bombers, another programme subsequently cancelled after a single trial take-off of a Victor from the de Havilland aerodrome at Hatfield. These two engines were then used in combination to power the development rounds of the Blue Steel missile stand-off bomb, together with the peroxide APU, from its first flight in October 1959.

Applications
Aerfer Leone
Blue Steel missile (Avro)
Handley Page Victor (XA930 only for trials)
Saunders-Roe SR.53
Vickers Type 559

Engines on display
Preserved Spectre engines are on display at the following museums:
 Royal Air Force Museum Cosford
 De Havilland Aircraft Museum
East Midlands Aeropark

Specifications (D.Sp.5)

See also

References

Further reading

Spectre
Aircraft rocket engines
Rocket engines using kerosene propellant